The 29th Chicago Film Critics Association Awards were announced on December 15, 2016. The awards honor the best in film for 2016. The nominations were announced on December 11. Moonlight received the most nominations (11), followed by Jackie (8), Manchester by the Sea (8), and La La Land (7).

Winners and nominees 
The winners and nominees for the 29th Chicago Film Critics Association Awards are as follows:

Awards

Awards breakdown 
The following films received multiple nominations:

The following films received multiple wins:

References

External links
 

 2016
2016 film awards